Jiangmifeng railway station is a railway station of Changchun–Tumen Railway and Jiuzhan–Jiangmifeng Railway. The station located in the Longtan District of Jilin, Jilin province, China.

See also
Jilin–Shulan Railway
Jiuzhan–Jiangmifeng Railway

References

Railway stations in Jilin